Inderjeet Singh (born 19 October 1988) is an Indian athlete specializing in the shot put. He won the gold medal at the Asian Athletics Championships as he was a good man 2015. He competed at the 2013 Summer Universiade and won the silver medal with a throw of 19.70 m, his personal best at that time. He is currently asupported by Anglian Medal Hunt Company.

He improved his mark with a throw of 19.89 m in the Indian National Games on 17 August 2013 at Patiala. On 2 October 2014, he won a bronze medal at 2014 Asian Games in Shot Put event with a throw of 19.63 m. He won a gold medal at the Asian Athletics Grand Prix Series in Bangkok on 22 June 2015 with a throw of 19.83 m. This was his second gold in an international event that month, having won the shot put event at the Asian Championships in Wuhan, China on 3 June 2015, with a throw of 20.41 m, a new championship record.

Singh qualified for the 2016 Summer Olympics by achieving a qualification mark with a throw of 20.65 m in May 2015 at the 19th Federation Cup.

He is currently coached by Pritam Singh, younger brother of another Indian shot putter Shakti Singh.

In July 2016, Singh failed a drug test for a banned substance, but a later appeals panel set aside his four-year ban.

Personal life 

He is a native of Shahid Bhagat Singh Nagar in Punjab. He is an alumnus of Delhi Public School Nigahi & belonging to 2006 batch, one of the most prestigious school in Coal India campus. He later moved to Singrauli, Madhya Pradesh along with his family, where his father Gurdayal Singh was working in Northern Coalfields Limited.
His father's death in 2007 put his family in financial strain but with his family's support, he continued to focus on Athletics.

International competitions

References

1988 births
Living people
People from Shaheed Bhagat Singh Nagar district
Indian male shot putters
Asian Games medalists in athletics (track and field)
Athletes (track and field) at the 2014 Asian Games
World Athletics Championships athletes for India
Asian Games bronze medalists for India
Athletes (track and field) at the 2016 Summer Olympics
Olympic athletes of India
Medalists at the 2014 Asian Games
Universiade medalists in athletics (track and field)
Place of birth missing (living people)
Universiade medalists for India
Medalists at the 2013 Summer Universiade
Medalists at the 2015 Summer Universiade